"La felicidad" is a song by Argentine singer Palito Ortega.

Covers 
Swedish singer Ewa Roos cover "Vilken härlig dag" ("What a Wonderful Day") charted on Svensktoppen for 12 weeks in 1968, topping the chart for three weeks in July.
Paraguayan singer Digno Garcia had a hit with the song in Belgium and The Netherlands, peeking at nr 4.

References 

Palito Ortega songs